The Santouri is a stringed instrument in the hammer dulcimer family. There are Greek, Persian and Indian types; they are distinct from each other in style, construction, tuning and technique. The Persian and Indian  instruments are more widely known as the Santur and Santoor, respectively.   

Santouri may also refer to:
 Santouri (film), an Iranian film directed by Dariush Mehrjui